Ross Shor Lynch (born December 29, 1995) is an American actor, singer, and musician. He was the lead vocalist of the pop rock band R5 and is one half of the band the Driver Era (with his brother Rocky Lynch). As an actor, he rose to recognition for his debut role as Austin Moon on Disney Channel's comedy television series Austin & Ally and for his role as Brady in the network's Teen Beach Movie film series.

In 2017, Lynch starred in the biopic My Friend Dahmer as a teenage Jeffrey Dahmer. In 2018, he starred in Status Update as Kyle. Between 2018 and 2020, he starred as Harvey Kinkle in the Netflix series Chilling Adventures of Sabrina.

Early life
Lynch was born and raised in the Denver suburb of Littleton, Colorado. He has four siblings, sister Rydel, and brothers Riker, Rocky, and Ryland. He was educated at home starting in the fourth grade when he learned to sing and play the guitar and piano. Lynch is a second cousin of entertainers Derek Hough and Julianne Hough, their maternal grandmothers being sisters. Lynch and his family moved to Los Angeles in 2007.

Acting career
Lynch has appeared on the television shows So You Think You Can Dance and Moises Rules!, and in the 2010 short film Grapple. He was in Kidz Bop, appearing in a 2009 Kidz Bop video. He was also in Cymphonique's music video for "Lil' Miss Swagger".

In early 2011, Lynch was cast in the pilot for the Disney Channel sitcom Austin & Ally, playing the lead male role of Austin Moon, a teenage singer who becomes an overnight sensation after a music video featuring him performing is uploaded to the Internet. He later forms a partnership with Ally, played by Laura Marano. The pilot was later picked up for a full season's production; the show debuted in December 2011, and was renewed for a second season in March 2012. After four seasons, the series ended on January 10, 2016. Lynch guest starred with the Austin & Ally cast in a crossover episode with Jessie, and also he guest starred with his co-star Laura Marano on Girl Meets World, where he reprised his role as Austin Moon.

In early 2012, Lynch began working on the Disney Channel Original Movie Teen Beach Movie, playing the male lead role, Brady. The film was directed by Jeffrey Hornaday and premiered July 19, 2013, earning around 8.4 million viewers. Lynch also starred in the sequel, Teen Beach 2, which premiered on the Disney Channel on June 26, 2015, earning 7.5million total viewers.

Lynch made a cameo appearance in the 2014 film Muppets Most Wanted. In 2016, he voiced the role of Piers in the English dub of the animated French adventure film Snowtime! The film centers around a group of children who plan and stage a giant snowball fight during the Christmas holiday.

In May 2016, it was announced that Lynch would be starring in his feature film debut, Status Update, a comedy that began filming in Vancouver in June and wrapped in July 2016. Lynch stars as a teenager who stumbles upon a magical app that causes his social media status updates to come true. In July, he was cast as a teenage Jeffrey Dahmer in My Friend Dahmer, a film based on the 2012 graphic novel of the same name by Derf Backderf.

Lynch starred as Mark Anthony in the Hollywood Bowl's production of A Chorus Line, which ran for three performances over the weekend of July 29, 2016. The musical, about dancers auditioning for a Broadway musical, was directed and choreographed by Baayork Lee, who starred in the original Broadway production.

In 2018, Lynch was cast in the role of Harvey Kinkle, Sabrina Spellman's boyfriend, on the Netflix series Chilling Adventures of Sabrina.

Music career

Lynch plays piano, drums, and bass; he specializes in guitar. He has danced for the Rage Boyz Crew, a group founded by a dance company in Southern California.

His debut single, "A Billion Hits", was released on April 2, 2012. On July 13, 2012, Lynch released his second soundtrack single, "Heard It on the Radio", which reached number 196 on UK Singles Chart. Lynch has recorded a multitude of songs for Austin & Ally. He sang all 14 songs for the TV show's soundtrack, which was released on September 12, 2012. These songs include "Can't Do It Without You" (the theme song for the series), "A Billion Hits", "Heard It on the Radio", and two songs with his band R5. The album peaked at #27 on the Billboard 200, one on the Billboard's Top Soundtracks and one on the Billboard's Kid Albums.

Lynch also sang most of the songs from Austin & Ally: Turn It Up, the show's second soundtrack. He recorded songs for Teen Beach Movie, the soundtrack of which was the fourth best-selling soundtrack of 2013 in the United States with 407,000 copies sold. He also sang two songs on the Austin & Ally: Take It from the Top EP. In 2015, Lynch recorded songs for Teen Beach 2, the soundtrack of which debuted at number 10 on the Billboard 200.

In 2016, Lynch contributed vocals to Tritonal's song "I Feel the Love" from their album Painting with Dreams.

With R5 / The Driver Era

In March 2010, R5 self-released an EP, Ready Set Rock and in April 2012, they signed with Hollywood Records. Their second EP, Loud, was released on February 19, 2013, which featured the lead single and title track "Loud". The band's first full-length album, Louder, was released on September 24, 2013, and the album includes the four songs from Loud as well as seven new songs. The second single from the album, "Pass Me By", premiered on Radio Disney on August 16, 2013. The music video premiered on August 29 on Disney Channel and is available for public viewing on the band's Vevo channel. The third single, "(I Can't) Forget About You", was released on December 25, 2013, and reached number 47 on the Billboard Digital Pop Songs chart, and the fourth single "One Last Dance" was released on May 29, 2014. The third extended play, Heart Made Up on You, was released on July 22, 2014, and the self-titled single was released on August 1, 2014.

On November 16, 2014, the band released the first single from second album, "Smile". "Let's Not Be Alone Tonight", the second single, was released on February 13, 2015.[22] "All Night" was released as the third single on June 2, 2015, along with the album's iTunes pre-order.[23] The band released their second full-length album on July 10, 2015, titled Sometime Last Night, and debuted at number 6 on the Billboard 200, number 1 on the Billboard Top Pop Albums, number 3 on the Billboard Top Digital Albums, and number 4 on the Billboard Top Album Sales.

On May 12, 2017, R5 released their fifth EP New Addictions.

On February 1, 2018, R5 posted on their YouTube a video called "The Last Show". On March 1, R5's Instagram and Twitter handles were changed to "the Driver Era" and all of R5's previous posts were deleted. On March 2, it was reported that the Driver Era would be a band consisting only of Ross and Rocky.

Filmography

Film

Television

Stage
 A Chorus Line at the Hollywood Bowl (2016), as Mark Anthony

Discography

With R5

With the Driver Era

Soundtrack

Promotional singles

Other charted songs

Other appearances

Music videos

Awards and nominations

Notes

References

External links 

 
  
 Ross Lynch at TV Guide

1995 births
Living people
21st-century American male actors
21st-century American singers
American child singers
American male child actors
American male film actors
American male guitarists
American male pop singers
American male singers
American male television actors
Child pop musicians
Guitarists from Colorado
Hollywood Records artists
Male actors from Colorado
People from Littleton, Colorado
R5 (band) members
Rhythm guitarists
Singers from Colorado
Walt Disney Records artists